Marajul (also Romanized as Marājūl; also known as Marjal) is a village in Bakeshluchay Rural District, in the Central District of Urmia County, West Azerbaijan Province, Iran. At the 2006 census, its population was 369, in 106 families.

References 

Populated places in Urmia County